Camila Oliveira Fairclough (born 1979) is a Brazilian and British artist who lives in Paris.

Early life 
Camila Oliveira Fairclough was born in 1979 at Rio de Janeiro. She studied at the Escola de Artes Visuais do Parque Lage (Rio de Janeiro) with Nelson Leirner and at the Beaux-arts de Paris with Jean-Marc Bustamente, Sylvie Fanchon and Bernard Piffaretti.

Work 
Her artistic practice includes painting, artist's book, performance, with the creation of works that mixes language, popart and abstraction. Oliveira Fairclough has exhibited internationally at museums  such as the Minus Space (New York), the Centre Pompidou (Paris), the Mudam (Luxembourg), NortArt, Büdelsdorf, and galleries such as Urs von Unger Gallery (Saanen), Emmanuel Hervé, Luis Adelantado, Laurent Godin.

Collections 
Her work is present in the collections of the Centre Pompidou, the Fonds National d'art Contemporain (Paris), the Fonds régional d'art contemporain Normandie Rouen, Alsace, Bretagne, Iles-de-France,  (Charleroi) among others.

Selected bibliography 

 Camila Oliveira Fairclough : Marble Memo, Montbeliard: Le 19, Centre d'Art Contemporain, 2010 
 Armer les toboggans : Robert Breer, Pierre Labat, Camila Oliveira Fairclough, Quimper: Le Quartier Editions, 2013 
 Jérôme Dupeyrat, Entretiens : perspectives contemporaines sur les publications d'artistes, Saint-Senoux: Incertain sens, 2018 
 Forsythia, lilac and geranium, with Raffaella della Olga and Elsa Werth, Saint-Senoux: Incertain sens, 2021,

References

External link 
 Official website

1979 births
Living people
École des Beaux-Arts alumni
21st-century Brazilian women artists
brazilian women painters